Each winner of the 1962 Governor General's Awards for Literary Merit was selected by a panel of judges administered by the Canada Council for the Arts.

Winners

English Language
Fiction: Kildare Dobbs, Running to Paradise.
Poetry or Drama: James Reaney, Twelve Letters to a Small Town and The Killdeer and Other Plays.
Non-Fiction: Marshall McLuhan, The Gutenberg Galaxy.

French Language
Fiction: Jacques Ferron, Contes du pays incertain.
Poetry or Drama: Jacques Languirand, Les insolites et les violons de l'automne.
Non-Fiction: Gilles Marcotte, Une littérature qui se fait.

Governor General's Awards
Governor General's Awards
Governor General's Awards